Keith Drury may refer to:
 Keith Drury (theologian)
 Keith Drury (artist)